Amauna is a village located in the Nabinagar Block of Aurangabad district in the Indian state of Bihar.

References

Villages in Aurangabad district, Bihar